Ceroplesis suturalis is a species of beetle in the family Cerambycidae. It was described by Harold in 1880.

References

suturalis
Beetles described in 1880